Garnacha is a Spanish name that may refer to:
 Garnacha (grape), a red wine grape
 Garnacha (food), a fried corn tortilla dish
Garnacha blanca, a white wine grape
 Garnacha Tintorera, a synonym of Alicante Bouschet